Egon Holde Weidekamp (14 March 1921, Copenhagen – 26 April 2000, Copenhagen) was a Danish politician.

The political career of Weidekamp started in 1946 when he became the national leader of DSU, the youth branch of the Social Democratic Party, a position he held until 1950. In 1952 he was elected to the city council of Copenhagen for the Social Democratic Party, of which he became the president from 1970 to 1976. From 1976 to 1989, he held the office of Lord Mayor of Copenhagen.

The primary focus of Egon Weidekamp was to provide better apartments for the citizens of Copenhagen, primarily by renewing many of the worst apartments of the city. He is widely known in Denmark for giving the rights to use Ungdomshuset on Jagtvej 69 (which was torn down in 2007) to the group of squatters called  after many years of social unrest and riots. In 1982, he said in an interview to Danish tabloid newspaper B.T.: "They get a house, and we get peace."

Egon Weidekamp also made the decision of closing the system of trams in the streets of Copenhagen.

References

External links

 

1921 births
2000 deaths
20th-century Copenhagen City Council members
Mayors of places in Denmark
Social Democrats (Denmark) politicians
Politicians from Copenhagen
Burials at East Bispebjerg Cemetery